Sylvia Mason-James (born 8 December 1958) is a British singer who has worked extensively as a backing vocalist and solo artist.

Early life and career
Mason-James was born on 8 December 1958 in south London, United Kingdom to immigrants from Jamaica. She started her career with the disco band Voyage in 1977. She performed a duet with Jimmy Nail on his chart-topping single "Ain't No Doubt" in 1992, and appeared as a backing vocalist on the 1992 Joan Armatrading album Square the Circle, along with Linda Lewis and her sister Shirley Lewis. She appeared as the vocalist on Chicane's "Strong in Love" in 1998 (Chicane featuring Mason) and Freemasons' "Nothing but a Heartache" in 2007. She has also released a solo single with a cover version of the Diana Ross song "Touch Me in the Morning".

Recently, she appeared as a vocalist on two songs from Superchumbo's Wowie Zowie album. Mason-James also sang on Scott and Leon's "Shine On", "Sounds of Eden" and "You Used to Hold Me". She has appeared as a backing vocalist on music by artists including Go West, Simple Minds, Adam Rickitt, Robbie Williams, Cher, Bo Selecta, Swing Out Sister, Sheena Easton, The Blow Monkeys and most frequently, Pet Shop Boys.

Mason-James has also toured extensively with Pet Shop Boys, including Glastonbury 2000 where they played second billing to Travis on The Pyramid Stage, at Live 8 in 2005, their extensive 2006/2007 Fundamental World Tour, as well as their month-long residency at the Savoy Theatre in 1997, their 2006 BBC Radio Theatre and Radio 2 concerts, and their iconic 1991 Performance World Tour.

Mason-James performed backing vocals for Roger Waters on the seventh and last leg of his The Dark Side of the Moon Live world tour between 27 April and 18 May 2008, replacing Katie Kissoon.

References

External links

Living people
Pet Shop Boys
1959 births
UK garage singers
20th-century Black British women singers
21st-century Black British women singers
English people of Nigerian descent